Pottery had its roots deep in the subcontinent and Bangladesh was not an exception. Although Bangladesh is predominantly a Muslim country, pottery is predominantly a Hindu craft.
Symmetrical, smooth, bright and unless it falls, it would last a long time-these attributes made things  of pottery very popular.

Origin

The origin of pottery in Bangladesh dates back to the Mahenjodaro and Harappa civilization after the earthenware were found after the excavation of Mohasthangar of bogra. The categorical folk arts found are still being used for modern artifacts.
The potters are predominantly Hindus. Most of them bear the same surname-Pal. For most, it has been a traditional profession carried by their families. Most of them make utilitarian vessels for carrying water and cooking. While the others make sculptures (mürti) for worship and showpieces.

Potters were popularised during the zamindars. They used to be patronised for making statues of goddesses, plates and other aesthetical items. Sometimes they were made to sculpt statues of the zamindar themselves. But after the end of the zamindar, they started making everyday household items for sale in the local markets to earn a living. They also made the wheels of the popular transportation system Gorur Gari (a lightweight cart pulled by male cows).

Pottery villages

The Dhamrai pottery industry is the most renowned village for pottery in Bangladesh. There are several pottery villages in Dhamrai, such as Kagojipara, Shimulia Pal para, Notun bondor, etc. These villages are well known for their pottery expertise and the Pal family residence for generations.
Most of the artisans work here as freelancers. They make the product and sell it in the local market.

Terracotta
Terracotta indicates the clay after pottery has been burned by fire and heated. It is a popular form of making sculptures via pottery. It demanded very little, as the products made of clay could be baked cake under the sun for one year or burned to give them an orange-clay color and greatly improve the durability.
Most of the artisans opted for terracotta as it was easier and the cheaper option. This tradition could also be traced back to the Mahenjodarro and Harappa civilisations.

References

 
 
 History dictionary of Bangladesh, Page 89

Bangladeshi handicrafts
Bangladeshi culture
Pottery by country